Pygmy poppy is a common name for the following plant species: 

Plants in genus Canbya, especially:
Canbya candida,  with white flowers
Eschscholzia minutiflora, with yellow flowers